Capys alphaeus, the protea scarlet or orange-banded protea, is a butterfly of the family Lycaenidae. It is found in South Africa.

The wingspan is 31–40 mm for males and 32–47 mm for females. Adults are on wing from August to November and from February to April in two main generations.

The larvae feed on the flower buds of various Protea species, including P. cynaroides, P. roupelliae, P. subvestita, P. repens and P. grandiceps.

Subspecies
Capys alphaeus alphaeus (from the Cape Peninsula to the Kouebokkeveld Mountains and southern Namaqualand, the Western Cape and then to the Eastern Cape)
Capys alphaeus extentus Quickelberge, 1979 (from the Eastern Cape along the mountains to the eastern part of the Free State and the KwaZulu-Natal Drakensberg, Eswatini, Mpumalanga and Limpopo)

References

Capys (butterfly)
Butterflies described in 1777